Herichthys tamasopoensis, also known as the Tamasopo cichlid, is a species of cichlid endemic to the Tamasopo River of the Panuco River in San Luis Potosí state of central-eastern Mexico. The Tamasopo is a tributary of the Panuco River.

It reaches a maximum size of  TL.

References

tamasopoensis
Endemic fish of Mexico
Freshwater fish of Mexico
Pánuco River
Natural history of San Luis Potosí
Cichlid fish of North America
Fish described in 1993